Karl Perl  ( March 3, 1876 – 1965) Austrian sculptor and engraver, born in Liezen, Austria.  He studied with Hellmer, Zumbusch and Kundmann and is remembered for his busts, bas reliefs and medallions.  He worked and died in Vienna.

References

External links
 Austrian Coins, Medals and Tokens: Karl Perl

1876 births
1965 deaths
Austrian sculptors
Austrian male sculptors
20th-century sculptors